The 2009 refugee crisis in Pakistan was the massive displacement of civilians in the Khyber Pakhtunkhwa of Pakistan that was caused by Operation Black Thunderstorm.

Since the beginning of Operation Black Thunderstorm against the Taliban, over 1.2 million people have been displaced in across Pakistan's Khyber Pakhtunkhwa, joined by a further 555,000 Pakistanis uprooted by fighting since August 2008. The refugees are known in Pakistan as Internally Displaced Persons (IDPs).

Most of the 1.2 million people who have escaped the violence were staying with relatives or friends, placing tremendous strain on the country, while over 300,000 others are seeking refuge in UNHCR-supported camps.

By 22, 1 August.6 million of 2.2 million returned home, as per UN estimates.

Background

UNICEF was responsible to provide WASH facilities at camp level. In this regards they have selected IDP's to fulfill their works in camps e.g., SSD, IRSP, HRDS, HDOD, RID and many other.

Special Support Group (IDPs)
In order to give full support to the government of Khyber Pakhtunkhwa to manage and arrange all the matters pertaining to Internally Displaced Persons (IDPs), Special Support Group (IDPs) was formed at the federal level. Special Support Group (IDPs) has been helping the provincial government to arrange: 
Registration
Medical Cover
Camp Management
Distribution of relief goods
For more information Special Support Group (IDPs)

International response

Non-state entities

Effects
The fighting since August has so far left up to 2 million displaced.

Weather conditions
The federal government was considering shifting the internally displaced persons (IDPs) from the refugee camps set up in Mardan, Nowshera, Swabi and other hot areas of NWFP to Abbottabad and Mansehra districts, as they are reportedly not acclimatised to hot weather. but due to negligence of federal government, it wasn't made a reality.

Managing Director Zumurrad Khan of the Pakistan Baitul Maal said that scorching heat in Mardan and other areas of Khyber Pakhtunkhwa was unbearable for the IDPs of Swat and Malakand Division.

See also
 Operation Black Thunderstorm
 Operation Rah-e-Rast
 Insurgency in Khyber Pakhtunkhwa

References

External links
Refugees in Pakistan: Incapable Government

Conflicts in 2009
Refugee Crisis In Pakistan, 2009
Military history of Pakistan
Non-combat military operations involving Pakistan
Refugees in Pakistan
Insurgency in Khyber Pakhtunkhwa

vi:Chiến dịch Bão Sấm Đen